Michael VI Bringas, called Stratiotikos or Stratioticus ("the Military One", "the Warlike", or "the Bellicose") or Gerontas ("the Old"), reigned as Byzantine emperor from 1056 to 1057.

Career
Apparently a relative of the powerful courtier Joseph Bringas (influential during the reign of Romanos II), Michael Bringas was an elderly patrician and a member of the court bureaucracy who had served as military finance minister (and hence the epithet Stratiotikos). Michael Bringas was chosen by the empress Theodora as her successor shortly before her death on August 31, 1056. The appointment had been secured through the influence of Leo Paraspondylos, Theodora's most trusted adviser.

Although Michael managed to survive a conspiracy organized by Theodosios, a nephew of the former emperor Constantine IX Monomachos, he was faced with the disaffection of the military aristocracy.  His most costly error was to ignore the perceived rights of the general Nikephoros Bryennios, whom he restored to his former rank after his falling out with the Empress Theodora, but refused to restore his wealth and estates. After dismissing Bryennios's grievances in an audience, the emperor completely alienated the military, which remained a powerful element of society. Michael compounded his error by rebuffing Bryennios after he had already ordered the restored general to lead a division of 3,000 men to reinforce the army in Cappadocia. From here Bryennios began plotting to overthrow Michael VI, and it was his capture that precipitated the military nobility to rally around the general Isaac Komnenos, who was proclaimed emperor in Paphlagonia on 8 June 1057.

Although Michael lost heart, the bureaucrats around him attempted to defend their position and assembled an army against the rebels. On 26 August 1057, the government's army was routed at the Battle of Petroe near Nicaea, and Isaac Komnenos advanced on Constantinople. Michael VI attempted to negotiate with the rebels through the famous courtier Michael Psellos, offering to adopt Isaac as his son and to grant him the title of kaisar (caesar), but his proposals were publicly rejected. Privately Isaac showed himself more open to negotiation, and he was promised the status of co-emperor. However, during the course of these secret negotiations, a riot in favor of Isaac broke out in Constantinople. Patriarch Michael Keroularios convinced Michael VI to abdicate in Isaac's favor on 30 August 1057. The emperor duly followed the patriarch's advice and became a monk. He retired to his private home and died there shortly thereafter.

Sources

Primary sources
 Michael Psellus, Chronographia.

Secondary sources
 
 
George Finlay (1853). History of the Byzantine Empire from 716–1057, William Blackwood & Sons.

See also

List of Byzantine emperors

References

11th-century Byzantine emperors
Monarchs who abdicated
Eastern Orthodox monks
Eastern Orthodox monarchs
Year of birth unknown
Place of birth unknown
1050s deaths
1050s in the Byzantine Empire
Logothetai tou stratiotikou